Josef Antonín Sehling (also Seeling, Seling, Sölling; 7 January 1710 – 19 September 1756) was a Bohemian composer and violinist of the baroque period.

Life
Sehling was born in Toužim (German: Teusing), Western Bohemia. From an early age, he received music lessons from the local cantor, and later completed his education in Prague and Vienna. From 1737 he was second violinist in the Orchestra of St. Vitus Cathedral, and around the same time, he worked as a court musician and composer for Count Morzin at his palace in Prague. In 1740 he became choir director at the Church of Our Lady beneath the Chain in the Malá Strana district of Prague, and at the same time filled in as the choir director at St. Vitus and the Barnabite St. Benedictus.

Sehling was a very prolific composer of sacred music, namely arias, masses, requiems, motets and offertoria. Manuscript copies of his works are scattered throughout libraries, among others, in Nymburk, Roudnice nad Labem, Broumov, St. Vitus cathedral, and in the monastery of the elizabethans. He was possibly associated with Christoph Willibald Gluck.

Among his pupils were the sopranist Johann Christian Preissler from Polevsko and the Premonstratensian Johann Oelschlegel (1724–1788), choir rector in Strahov Monastery, organ builder and composer.

Compositions (selection)
Oratorium Filius prodigus, 1739
Judith, a coronation opera in celebration of the coronation Maria Theresia as queen of Bohemia, 1743
Constantinus, 1751
Missa Bella premunt hostilia
Missa De robur for auxilium

Bibliography
Josef Weinmann: Egerländer Biografisches Lexikon mit ausgewählten Personen aus dem ehemaligen Reg.-Bezirk Eger. Band 2, Druckhaus Bayreuth, Bayreuth, Männedorf/ZH 1987, S. 190
Der Egerländer September 1981
Heimatbrief für die Kreise Plan-Weseritz und Tepl-Petschau. 1985/86
Constantin von Wurzbach: Sehling, Joseph Anton. In: Biographisches Lexikon des Kaiserthums Oesterreich. 33. Theil. Kaiserlich-königliche Hof- und Staatsdruckerei, Vienna 1877, S. 322 f. (Digitisation).
Milada Jonášová: Italské operní árie v repertoáru kůru katedrály sv. Víta v Praze. Sehlingova éra 1737-1756. In Hudební věda 38, n. 3-4/2000, Academia, Praha 2001, pp. 263-301.
Milada Jonášová: Italienische Opernarien im Dom zu St. Veit in Prag. In: Norbert Dubowy – Herbert Seiffert – Andrea Sommer-Mathis – Reinhard Strohm (eds.), Italian Opera in Central Europe 1614–1780, Berlin 2008, pp. 163–206.
Václav Kapsa: Hudebníci hraběte Morzina. K dějinám šlechtických kapel v Čechách v době baroka. Etnologický ústav AV ČR, Praha 2010.
Milada Jonášová, Judith – ein Jesuitendrama zur Krönung Maria Theresias 1743 in Prag, in: Petronilla Cemus (ed.), Bohemia Jesuitica 1556–2006, Praha 2010, p. 1041–1051.
Josef Sehling. Christmas in Prague Cathedral, Collegium Marianum. Jana Semerádová, Supraphon 2014.
Milada Jonášová (ed.): Joseph Anton Sehling, Latinské pastorely / Latin pastorellas / Lateinische Pastorellen, Praha 2017.

External links
Biography of Josef Antonín Sehling at touzimsko.estranky.cz (Czech)

1710 births
1756 deaths
People from Toužim
18th-century Bohemian musicians
Czech violinists
Male classical violinists
Czech male classical composers
Czech Classical-period composers
Czech classical violinists
18th-century classical composers
18th-century male musicians